Raceland may refer to:

 Raceland, Kentucky
 Raceland (race track), its eponymous horse racing track
 Raceland-Worthington Independent School District
 Raceland, Louisiana
 Raceland (estate), former estate and horse racing track in Framingham, Massachusetts
 Raceland (horse), American Thoroughbred racehorse
 Wacky Raceland, a comic book series introduced in 2016
 USS Raceland, formerly the USS Howick Hall (ID-1303), U.S. Maritime Commission ship (1941–1942)